VH1 Satellite Radio was a part of the XM Satellite Radio service from 2001 until September 30 2005.  The studios were located in Times Square in the Paramount Plaza building at the corner of Broadway and 50th Street in New York City.

The station provided content from Vh1 Shows as well as original programming.  

In September 2005, EVP of Programming for XM Radio Eric Logan announced that XM would be discontinuing Vh1 Satellite Radio and sister station, MTV Satellite Radio.

Shows 
VH1 Now with Kevin and Maria
Live from Manhattan with J-Kruz
Behind the Music
Five Song Set
VH1 Storytellers

Personalities 
Morning Host and Program Director: Maria Chambers
Morning Host and Writer: Kevin K (Currently Morning Host of Playboy Radio on Sirius Radio)
Morning Host: Peg Tully (Currently Associate Producer for MTV Radio Network)
Afternoon Host and Station Voice: J-Kruz (Currently Program Director and On-Air Host at X107.1 in the Cayman Islands)
Afternoon Host and Station Voice: AJ Gentile (Currently Actor/Host in Los Angeles, owns/operates The Joint Studios)

External links 
 XM Radio - XM Satellite Radio Online
 Interview with XM's Eric Logan - EVP of Programming explains why XM dropped VH1 Satellite Radio.
 Official web site of AJ Gentile - Official web site of AJ Gentile

Defunct radio networks in the United States
Radio stations established in 2001
Radio stations disestablished in 2005
Defunct radio stations in the United States